Christa Czekay, née Elsler (20 March 1944 in Waldenburg – 14 June 2017) was a West German sprinter who specialized in the 200 and 400 metres.

Biography
She won a bronze medal in 4 × 400 metres relay at the 1969 European Championships along with teammates Antje Gleichfeld, Inge Eckhoff and Christel Frese. She won a silver medal in the same event at the 1971 European Indoor Championships, this time with Gisela Ahlemeyer, Gisela Ellenberger and Anette Rückes.

She competed for the sports club MTV Peine during her active career.

References

1944 births
2017 deaths
People from Wałbrzych
Sportspeople from Lower Silesian Voivodeship
West German female sprinters
European Athletics Championships medalists